The scale-throated earthcreeper or scaly-throated earthcreeper (Upucerthia dumetaria) is a species of bird in the family Furnariidae. It is found in Argentina, Chile and the Altiplano; it winters in the Pampas and east of Córdoba. Its natural habitats are subtropical or tropical dry shrubland, subtropical or tropical high-altitude shrubland, and subtropical or tropical high-altitude grassland. They build their nests at the end of tunnels measuring between one and two meters. These tunnels are almost exclusively based on slopes; however, rock crevices are occasionally used. It formerly included the Patagonian forest earthcreeper (U. saturatior) as a subspecies.

References

External links
Image at ADW

scale-throated earthcreeper
Birds of Argentina
Birds of the Puna grassland
scale-throated earthcreeper
Taxonomy articles created by Polbot